Lesley-Anne Down (born 17 March 1954) is a British actress, singer and former model.

She achieved fame as Georgina Worsley in the ITV drama series Upstairs, Downstairs (1973–75). She received further recognition for her performances in the films The Pink Panther Strikes Again (1976), A Little Night Music (1977), The First Great Train Robbery (1979), Hanover Street (1979), Rough Cut (1980),  Sphinx (1981) and Nomads (1986). She is also known as Madeline Fabray in the miniseries North and South (1985–86), for which she was nominated for a Golden Globe Award in 1986.

In 1990, Down played the role Stephanie Rogers in the CBS drama series Dallas. During 1997–99, she played Olivia Richards in the NBC series Sunset Beach. From April 2003 to February 2012, she portrayed Jackie Marone in the CBS soap opera The Bold and the Beautiful.

Life and career

Early life and career
Down was born on 17 March 1954 and brought up in Wandsworth, London, England. She began acting and modelling, and in her teenage years won several beauty pageants. She was voted Britain's most beautiful teenager at the age of 15. 

She made her feature film debut in 1969 in a supporting role in the British drama The Smashing Bird I Used to Know. She later had roles in several other British films, such as All the Right Noises, Assault, and Countess Dracula, and guest-starred in the television series Six Dates with Barker, Out of the Unknown, and  Public Eye.

Film and television roles
In 1973, Down was cast as Georgina Worsley on the Emmy Award-winning British drama series, Upstairs, Downstairs. Her fame led to a nude photoshoot for the magazine Mayfair in 1975. Upstairs, Downstairs was her career breakthrough; after the show ended in 1975, she moved to Hollywood and began her film career. She starred in the 1976 movie The Pink Panther Strikes Again, and later was cast opposite Elizabeth Taylor on the film adaptation of A Little Night Music. Her major roles were in The Betsy (1978), The First Great Train Robbery (1979), Hanover Street (1979), Rough Cut (1980), and box-office bomb Sphinx (1981).

She appeared onstage in Hamlet and a musical version of Great Expectations.

Down has played a number of leading roles in made-for-television movies and miniseries. She starred in 1978 British drama The One and Only Phyllis Dixey (as the title character). She played the role of Esméralda in a British-American TV movie The Hunchback of Notre Dame in 1982 (opposite Anthony Hopkins), Indiscreet (1988), and Ladykillers (1988). In 1985, she starred in Arch of Triumph with Anthony Hopkins and Donald Pleasence. She starred in the ABC miniseries The Last Days of Pompeii in 1984, and in North and South in 1985. For her role as Madeline Fabray LaMotte Main in North and South, she was nominated for Golden Globe Award in 1986. She later starred in North and South, Book II (1986), and Heaven & Hell: North & South, Book III (1994).

In 1990, Down was cast as series regular for a limited run in the CBS primetime soap opera Dallas as Stephanie Rogers. She earned a quarter of a million dollars' salary for a 10-week shoot.

Later career
In the 1990s, Down starred in several small feature and television films, and played guest roles on television series such as The Nanny and Diagnosis: Murder. She starred in the 1994 film Death Wish V: The Face of Death, opposite Charles Bronson, and later appeared with him in the 1995 TV movie Family of Cops. 

In 1996, Aaron Spelling cast her as Olivia Richards on the NBC soap opera Sunset Beach. The series aired from January 1997 to December 1999. After the soap was cancelled, Down starred in Lifetime movies The Perfect Wife and You Belong to Me.

In 2003, Down was cast in another soap as Jackie Marone on CBS's The Bold and the Beautiful. In January 2012, Down confirmed that she would be departing the programme. Down also appeared in the films The King's Guard with Eric Roberts and Ron Perlman, The Meeksville Ghost, 13th Child, Today You Die, and Seven Days of Grace (on which she was also a screenwriter). 

In 2011, Down appeared in Victor Salva's thriller film Rosewood Lane with Rose McGowan, Ray Wise, and Lauren Vélez. She later starred alongside Kirsten Vangsness in the comedy film Kill Me, Deadly, and played mother of leads in Dark House, I Am Watching You and Justice.

In 2020, Down returned to acting playing British Prime Minister Margaret Thatcher in the biographical drama Reagan starring Dennis Quaid.

Personal life
After ending a 10-year relationship with actor-writer Bruce Robinson, Down married Enrique Gabriel in 1980, but ended their marriage after a year and a half. Her second marriage was to film director William Friedkin from 1982 to 1985, with whom she had one son, Jack (born 1982).

She met her third husband, cinematographer Don E. Fauntleroy, during filming of the television miniseries North and South in 1985. They began a relationship, which ended Down's marriage to Friedkin and Fauntleroy's marriage to Susan Ducat. The resulting legal and custody proceedings interrupted the careers of both Down and Fauntleroy for two years and ultimately cost Down and Friedkin  each. Down and Fauntleroy have a son, George-Edward (b. 1998).

Down has spoken on several occasions about dealing with sexual predators in the film industry. In 2002, she spoke of finding fame in the late 1960s: "The casting couch was in full swing, people expected it... My teenage years were pretty intense, a lot of pressure and a lot of horrible old men out there". In a 1977 interview, she had also said: "I was promised lots of lovely big film parts by American producers if I went to bed with them. Believe me, the casting couch is no myth".

Filmography

Film

Television

Awards and nominations

References

External links

Lesley-Anne Down(Aveleyman)

1954 births
Living people
20th-century British actresses
21st-century British actresses
20th-century English people
20th-century English women
21st-century English people
21st-century English women
People from Wandsworth
English female models
English women singers
English film actresses
English soap opera actresses
English television actresses
English emigrants to the United States